Hashim Amir Ali (Urdu: هاشم أمير على), (8 May 1903 - 1987), was an Islamic scholar and author.

Life

In 1938 Ali came under the influence of Mirza Abul Fazl, who aroused his interest in and reverence for the Qur'an. He was a scholar of wide erudition and clear vision, and was gifted with special insight into the Qur'an. He devoted more than thirty years in translating the Qur'an into poetic English to recapture its beauty and rhythm. He was aware of the significance of the chronological order of the Qur'anic revelation and arranged it according to chronological order. His translation came out in 1974 with the title, The Message of the Qur'an: Presented in Perspective.

Ali was an educator and an active advocate of calendar reform for about ten years. He was a leading Muslim authority on calendar matters. He initiated in Hyderabad a movement to synchronize the dates of the Fasli months with the Gregorian calendar, and finally succeeded, in 1946, in persuading the Nizam to authorize the proposed reform. His success in this far-reaching revision emboldened him, as a liberal Muslem, to analyze the problem of introducing effectively The World Calendar in the realm of the Crescent. He returned to America in 1953 under a fellowship from the Fulbright and Ford Foundation.

Hashim Amir-Ali died in 1987 at Banjara Hills, Hyderabad, survived by one daughter and two sons. His sons Hyder Amir-Ali and Asad Amir-Ali and daughter Naveed Jehan Reza are now residing in the U.S.A.

Publications
 Rural Research in Tagore's Sriniketon (1934)
 The Student's Quran : An Introduction. (1961)
 The Environs of Tagore - Then and Now. (1961)
 Facts and Fancies - A book of essays. (1947)
 The Meos of Mewat; old neighbours of New Delhi. (1970)
 The Message of the Qur'an : Presented in Perspective. (1974)
 Upstream Downstream : Reconstruction of Islamic Chronology (1978)

References

External links
 The Message of the Qur’an (First Edition), Tokyo, 1974.
 "Three Years With Tagore"
 "The Meos of Mewat; old neighbours of New Delhi" (1970)
https://www.google.com/search?q=hashim+amir+ali&sxsrf=ALeKk02YErutvSXfHDk91w-ZVJODJkUd9g:1618870653672&source=lnms&tbm=isch&sa=X&ved=2ahUKEwjN9f6Rq4vwAhWnF1kFHd9YAR4Q_AUoAXoECAEQAw&biw=1869&bih=935#imgrc=zB4h7iZ5zZsHEM

1903 births
1987 deaths
20th-century Muslim scholars of Islam
20th-century Indian Muslims
Scholars from Hyderabad, India
Translators of the Quran into English
20th-century Indian translators